Marcus Feinbier (born 30 November 1969) is a retired German football player. He is currently working as a leader of the youth department at FC Leverkusen.

Feinbier played at senior level for 10 different clubs in 21 seasons in the first three levels of the (West) German football league system.

Honours
 UEFA Cup winner: 1987–88

References

External links
 
 

1969 births
Living people
Association football forwards
German footballers
Germany under-21 international footballers
Bayer 04 Leverkusen players
Bayer 04 Leverkusen II players
Hertha BSC players
Wuppertaler SV players
Alemannia Aachen players
SG Wattenscheid 09 players
1. FC Nürnberg players
Rot Weiss Ahlen players
SpVgg Greuther Fürth players
Fortuna Düsseldorf players
SV Elversberg players
UEFA Cup winning players
Bundesliga players
2. Bundesliga players
Footballers from Berlin
West German footballers